The 2018 NBA All-Star Game was an exhibition basketball game that was played on February 18, 2018, during the National Basketball Association's (NBA) 2017–18 season. It was the 67th edition of the NBA All-Star Game, and was played at Staples Center in Los Angeles, home of the Los Angeles Lakers and Los Angeles Clippers. Team LeBron defeated Team Stephen, 148–145. LeBron James, namesake of Team LeBron, was named the All-Star Game Most Valuable Player for recording 29 points, 10 rebounds, and 8 assists; it was his third time winning the award since the 2008 All-Star Game. This was the sixth time that Los Angeles had hosted the NBA All-Star Game and the first time since 2011. The game was televised nationally by TNT for the 16th consecutive year, and simulcast on TBS for the 4th straight year.

Format change
On October 3, 2017, the NBA announced that the All-Star Game format would change from the traditional Eastern Conference versus Western Conference format, and would instead switch to a draft-style format, similar to the format used by the NHL All-Star Game from 2011 through 2015 and the NFL Pro Bowl from 2014 through 2016. The team captains were determined by the most votes received in their respective conference. Each team will pick a charity to play for, and the winning team will have money donated to their charity. The winning team will receive $100,000 for each player and the losing team $25,000 each.

All-Star Game

Coaches

The two teams were coached from their respective conference. Mike D'Antoni, coach of the Houston Rockets, was named as the head coach for Team Stephen. Dwane Casey, coach of the Toronto Raptors, was named as the head coach for Team LeBron.

Rosters
The rosters for the All-Star Game were selected through a voting process. The starters were chosen by the fans, media, and current NBA players. Fans make up 50% of the vote, and NBA players and media each comprise 25% of the vote. The two guards and three frontcourt players who receive the highest cumulative vote totals are named the All-Star starters. NBA head coaches vote for the reserves for their respective conferences, none of which can be players on their own team. Each coach selects two guards, three frontcourt players and two wild cards, with each selected player ranked in order of preference within each category. If a multi-position player is to be selected, coaches are encouraged to vote for the player at the position that was "most advantageous for the All-Star team", regardless of where the player was listed on the All-Star ballot or the position he was listed in box scores.

The All-Star Game starters were announced on January 18, 2018. Kyrie Irving of the Boston Celtics and DeMar DeRozan of the Toronto Raptors were named the backcourt starters in the East, earning their fifth and fourth all-star appearances, respectively. LeBron James was named a starter to his 14th career all-star game, breaking Dirk Nowitzki's record for most selections among active players. Joining James in the East frontcourt was Joel Embiid of the Philadelphia 76ers, his first selection, and Giannis Antetokounmpo of the Milwaukee Bucks, his second selection.

Stephen Curry of the Golden State Warriors and James Harden of the Houston Rockets were named to the starting backcourt in the West, earning their fifth and sixth all-star appearances, respectively. In the frontcourt, Kevin Durant of the Golden State Warriors was named to his ninth career all-star game, along with DeMarcus Cousins and Anthony Davis of the New Orleans Pelicans, their fourth and fifth all-star selections, respectively. During the All-Star Game, Davis would wear his teammate Cousins' jersey as a means of honoring him after his season-ending injury occurred before the All-Star Game began.

The All-Star Game reserves were announced on January 23, 2018. The West reserves include Russell Westbrook of the Oklahoma City Thunder, his seventh selection, Klay Thompson and Draymond Green of the Golden State Warriors, their fourth and third all-star selections, respectively, LaMarcus Aldridge of the San Antonio Spurs, his sixth selection, Damian Lillard of the Portland Trail Blazers, his third selection, and Karl-Anthony Towns and Jimmy Butler of the Minnesota Timberwolves, their first and fourth all-star selections, respectively. Westbrook would later be named the replacement starter for DeMarcus Cousins' open starting spot on the team.

The East reserves include Kyle Lowry of the Toronto Raptors, his fourth selection, Al Horford of the Boston Celtics, his fifth selection, John Wall and Bradley Beal of the Washington Wizards, their fifth and first all-star selections, respectively, Victor Oladipo of the Indiana Pacers, his first selection, Kevin Love of the Cleveland Cavaliers, his fifth selection, and Kristaps Porzingis of the New York Knicks, his first selection.

Draft
LeBron James and Stephen Curry were named as captains due to being the leading vote getter from the East and West, respectively. James had the first pick in the draft as the leading vote getter overall, while Curry has first choice of jersey color, due to the Western Conference having home team status for the game. The draft pool consisted of the eight other starters, with no regard to conference designation, and 14 reserves (seven from each conference), chosen by NBA head coaches. On January 25, 2018, LeBron James and Stephen Curry created their rosters via a draft, which would not be televised for various reasons. NBA Commissioner Adam Silver will select the replacement for any player unable to participate in the All-Star Game, choosing a player from the same conference as the player who is being replaced. Silver's selection would join the team that drafted the replaced player. If a replaced player is a starter, the head coach of that team will choose a new starter from his cast of players instead.

 DeMarcus Cousins was unable to play due to a season-ending Achilles injury.
 Paul George was selected as DeMarcus Cousins' replacement.
 John Wall was unable to participate due to a knee injury.
 Andre Drummond was selected as John Wall's replacement.
 Kevin Love was unable to participate due to a hand injury.
 Goran Dragić was selected as Kevin Love's replacement.
 Kristaps Porziņģis was unable to participate due to a season-ending torn ACL.
 Kemba Walker was named as Kristaps Porziņģis' replacement.
Russell Westbrook was selected to start in place of Cousins.

Game

National anthem
Fergie's performance of "The Star-Spangled Banner" prior to the game received heavy negative criticism and mockery online. The rendition—described as "unusual" and "bizarre"—was met with laughter from the arena crowd, and  All-Star Draymond Green was shown chuckling on the television broadcast. The following day, Fergie said she "wanted to try something special for the NBA," but it "didn't strike the intended tone."

All-Star Weekend

Celebrity Game

Mountain Dew KickStart Rising Stars Challenge

Skills Challenge

 Donovan Mitchell was removed due to replacing Aaron Gordon in the Slam Dunk Contest.
 Buddy Hield was named as Donovan Mitchell's replacement.
 Kristaps Porziņģis unable to participate due to a torn ACL.
 Andre Drummond was named as Kristaps Porziņģis' replacement.

Three-Point Contest

Slam Dunk Contest

 Aaron Gordon was unable to participate due to a hip injury.
 Donovan Mitchell was named as Aaron Gordon's replacement.

References

External links
2018 NBA All-Star Game at nba.com

2018 NBA All-Star Game
NBA All-Star Game
Basketball competitions in Los Angeles
All-Star
NBA All-Star Game
NBA All-Star Game
ABS-CBN television specials